Tell Me Baby is the debut and only Korean studio album by South Korean duo Isak N Jiyeon, a new 2002 group from SM Entertainment, released on September 3, 2002.

Overview

On the Autumn of 2002, the newest R&B Duo Isak N Jiyeon debuted with dark voices through their debut single and album of same name "Tell Me Baby". The album was the first and only album by Isak N Jiyeon before they disbanded.

Track listing

References

External links
 Isak N Jiyeon - Official website 
 SM Entertainment - Official SM Entertainment website 

2002 albums
SM Entertainment albums